was a Japanese politician and labor activist.

Early life and education 
Suzuki was born the oldest child of Suzuki Masuji on September 4, 1885 in what is now Kurihara, Miyagi prefecture. When he was 10 years old he and his father converted to Christianity. His family began to struggle financially when Suzuki was in middle school, and by the time he reached high school he had to pay his own way through school. He entered Tokyo Imperial University and with his upperclassman Sakuzō Yoshino, he began attending the Hongo Congregational Church ministered by Ebina Danjo. Influenced by the church's democratic atmosphere and sympathizing with 's reformist ideas, Suzuki decided to become a social activist.

Career 
After graduating from the university in 1909, Suzuki began working at what is now Dai Nippon printing. He got a job at the Tokyo Asahi Shimbun in 1910. He covered poverty. In 1911 he became the secretary of a Unitarian group that was headed by Abe Isoo.  He also worked with a labor group. In 1912 he formed the Yūaikai with 14 other people, so that they could raise the status of laborers. Suzuki served as the chairman. Branches of the organization opened all over Japan, with a total of 51 by the end of 1915.

In 1915 and 1916 Suzuki traveled to the United States to learn about labor unions there. While learning about labor rights and strike actions, he was inspired to push for all of the labor organizations to merge in order to obtain more bargaining power. In 1919, the Yūaikai renamed itself to the Nippon Rōdō Sōdōmei Yūaikai. By 1921, the organization became simply the Nippon Rōdō Sōdōmei, or the Japanese Federation of Labor. That year the group was able to convince 30,000 dock workers in Kobe to go on strike.

In 1926 he helped to form the Social Democratic Party. During the 1928 Japanese general election, he was elected to the House of Representatives representing Osaka's 4th district. He was one of the eight people who were the first to be elected to the Diet without a political party affiliation. After losing his seat in 1930, he was reelected in 1936 as a member of the Shakai Taishūtō.

In 1940, Saitō Takao was expelled from the Diet for making a speech questioning the "Holy War" in China. Suzuki supported him by leaving office along with several other Diet members. On March 12, 1946, Suzuki died in Sendai, Miyagi prefecture.

References 

1885 births
1946 deaths
People from Miyagi Prefecture
University of Tokyo alumni
Members of the House of Representatives (Empire of Japan)
Japanese trade union leaders